Basilio Pompili (16 April 1858 – 5 May 1931) was an Italian cardinal of the Roman Catholic Church. He served as Vicar General of Rome from 1913 until his death, and was elevated to the cardinalate in 1911.

Biography
Basilio Pompili was born in Spoleto, and studied at the Pontifical Roman Seminary before being ordained to the priesthood on 5 December 1886. He then did pastoral work in Rome from 1888 to 1904. During that time, Pompili was made auditor of the Sacred Congregation of the Council in 1891, an official in the Apostolic Penitentiary in 1896, and prelate adjunct of the Congregation of the Council on 16 March 1898. He was raised to the rank of a protonotary apostolic on 18 December 1899, and was named auditor of the Roman Rota on 18 July 1904. During his time at the Roman Rota, Pompili sat at the sixth trial for the annulment of Paul Ernest Boniface and Anna Gould.

Pompili later returned to the Congregation of the Council upon becoming its secretary on 31 January 1908. As secretary, he served as the second-highest official of that dicastery, successively under Cardinals Vincenzo Vannutelli and Casimiro Gennari. Before becoming a bishop, Pompili was created cardinal deacon of Santa Maria in Domnica by Pope Pius X in the consistory of 27 November 1911. Pius X later named him Vicar General of Rome, and thus in charge of the pastoral of the Diocese of Rome, on 7 April 1913.

On 5 May 1913, Pompili was appointed Titular Archbishop of Philippi. He received his episcopal consecration on the following 11 May from Cardinal Antonio Agliardi, with Archbishop Donato Sbarretti and Bishop Americo Bevilacqua serving as co-consecrators, in the church of S. Vincenzo de' Paoli alla Bocca della Verità. In late May 1914, Pompili opted to become a cardinal-priest, with the title of Santa Maria in Aracoeli. He then participated in the conclave of 1914, which elected Pope Benedict XV, and was named archpriest of the Lateran Basilica on 28 October 1914.

The cardinal vicar was elevated to Cardinal Bishop of Velletri-Segni on 22 March 1917, and was one of the cardinal electors in another conclave, that of 1922, resulting in the election of Pope Pius XI. In 1923, he exchanged visits with Filippo Cremonesi, a royal commissioner, who served as mayor of Rome from 1922 to 1926. Among other events, Pompili served as papal legate to the opening (24 December 1924) and closing (24 December 1925) of the holy door at the Lateran Basilica. On 9 July 1930, he was made Vice-dean of the College of Cardinals, remaining in that position until his death.

Pompili died in Rome, at age 73. He was initially buried at the Campo Verano cemetery, but his remains were later transferred to the Cathedral of his native Spoleto on 18 December 1933.

Trivia
Pompili was a onetime athlete.
From 1919 to 1920, he was camerlengo of the Sacred College of Cardinals.

Episcopal lineage

Pompili 's episcopal lineage, or apostolic succession was:

 Cardinal Scipione Rebiba
 Cardinal Giulio Antonio Santorio
 Cardinal Girolamo Bernerio
 Archbishop Galeazzo Sanvitale
 Cardinal Ludovico Ludovisi
 Cardinal Luigi Caetani
 Cardinal Ulderico Carpegna
 Cardinal Paluzzo Paluzzi Altieri degli Albertoni
 Pope Benedict XIII
 Pope Benedict XIV
 Cardinal Enrico Enríquez
 Archbishop Manuel Quintano Bonifaz
 Cardinal Buenaventura Fernández de Córdoba Spínola
 Cardinal Giuseppe Doria Pamphili
 Pope Pius VIII
 Pope Pius IX
 Cardinal Alessandro Franchi
 Cardinal Giovanni Simeoni
 Cardinal Antonio Agliardi
 Cardinal Basilio Pompili

References

External links
Cardinals of the Holy Roman Church
Catholic-Hierarchy

1858 births
1931 deaths
People from Spoleto
20th-century Italian cardinals
20th-century Italian Roman Catholic titular archbishops
Cardinal Vicars
Pontifical Commission of Sacred Archaeology
Pontifical Roman Seminary alumni
Cardinals created by Pope Pius X